The Parramatta Sun was a weekly regional newspaper which served the communities of Parramatta and the former Holroyd local government areas.  The newspaper was part of Fairfax Media Regional. The final edition of the newspaper was released in December 2017.

Its circulation was over 63,000 and readership over 78,000.

References

External links
 Official website

Defunct newspapers published in Sydney
Parramatta